El Reno is a city in and county seat of Canadian County, Oklahoma, United States. As of the 2020 census, the city population was 16,989, marking a change of 1.55% from 16,729, recorded in the 2010 census. The city was begun shortly after the 1889 land rush and named for the nearby Fort Reno.

History

The land of Canadian County belonged to the historic Cheyenne and Arapaho tribes at the time of European encounter. In 1874, the United States established a fort to supervise the area and General Philip Sheridan took command. He named it Fort Reno in honor of his friend, Gen. Jesse L. Reno, who was killed in the American Civil War.

After the 1889 landrun, there were three entities the local postmaster had to keep separate - Fort Reno, Reno City, and the community township or Village of (El) Reno. The Village of El Reno originated shortly after the 1889 land run, with the post office coming into being in June of that year.

Although "el reno" means "the reindeer" in Spanish, the town was actually named, in part, after nearby Fort Reno. Reindeer are not native to Oklahoma.

The town's name was taken from the nearby military post of Fort Reno, with the "el" (meaning "the" in spanish) later added by the local postmaster to help differentiate the community from the also newly established Reno City.

Reno City was located on the north-side of the Canadian River five miles northeast of community of El Reno. The community of El Reno was located on the south-side of the Canadian river.

The original village townsite was platted by the Oklahoma Homestead and Town Company on 120 acres of the homestead of John Foreman. In 1890, Foreman's 120 acres along with 80 acres of Thomas Jensen's, were incorporated into the Village of El Reno.

After the railroad company announced their rail lines were going to run on the south side of the Canadian river, Reno City relocated to the township of El Reno. The original Reno City site north of the river was abandoned. What remained and continues to this day is Fort Reno and the city of El Reno.

El Reno is located on the 98th meridian west, about 25 miles west of Oklahoma City. The eastern side of the meridian was opened to non-Indian settlement in the Land Rush of 1889. The western side was opened in 1892, when the federal government also made some Cheyenne and Arapaho lands available for settlement by non-Native Americans. The town was subsequently selected as the land district office for the 1901 land lottery drawings.

The federal reformatory housed male adult federal prisoners and was later restricted to house young adult male prisoners, aged 18 to 26. In the mid-1970s it was renamed by the United States Department of Justice, Federal Bureau of Prisons, as the Federal Correctional Institution, El Reno (FCI El Reno). Prisoner age limits were lifted and men of all ages have been incarcerated here ever since. As medium-security prison, it has become the fifth-largest federal prison in the U.S. The prison is still one of the largest employers in El Reno. In 2015 President Barack Obama visited the prison, the first time a sitting president has visited any federal prison.

The POW cemetery has been preserved and has stones bearing the names of German and Italian prisoners who died there.

Following World War II, the US Army determined it did not need the fort. In 1948 the fort was transferred to the U.S. Department of Agriculture, for use as a research laboratory. The laboratory studies environmentally sustainable forage and livestock production, contributing to preservation of the Great Plains of North America.

At one time, railroads contributed strongly to the city economy. A terminal and repair facility for the Chicago, Rock Island and Pacific Railroad (CRI&P or "Rock Island"), which employed a large number of people, was based here. Some 750 of the company's 970 employees in the state worked in El Reno. Due to changes taking place throughout the railroad industry, the CRI&P went bankrupt in 1979. It abandoned the depot and railyards in 1980. The railyards are still vacant.

The former train depot and some other buildings were acquired by the Canadian County Historical Society for adaptive use as part of a museum complex. The 1954 film noir Human Desire includes locomotive and yard scenes filmed in the El Reno rail yards.

El Reno is a Main Street America community. The Oklahoma Main Street Program is a statewide program, part of a national network affiliated with the National Trust for Historic Preservation. It emphasizes downtown revitalization related to public-private partnerships, with investment in public spaces and design, and overall management of retail mix. The El Reno started its Main Street program in 1988; it was one of four cities in 2006 selected nationally to win the annual Great American Main Street Award. El Reno has used economic development, historic preservation, and creative design to enhance the Rock District of downtown. Its high standards are reflected in having been accredited annually since 2016.

Since 1988 El Reno holds an annual Fried Onion Burger Day Festival in downtown the first Saturday in May. This event encourages the celebration of art, music, culture, food and community. The giant burger contains meat, fried onions, sliced pickles, and mustard - all held between two giant buns. Festival goers can get a piece of the monstrosity. Volunteers divide the giant burger into individual-sized portions, and other volunteers deliver the free portions to anyone in the crowd wanting a piece. The fried onion burger dates to the Great Depression, when households added onions to ground hamburger mix to stretch out the meat supply.

In 2001, El Reno was the first city in Oklahoma to re-establish streetcar service in the downtown area: the Heritage Express Trolley. Such service had not been available since 1947, and it was the only operating trolley line in the state that year. Another line has since been started in Oklahoma City. The Heritage Express was installed with aid of a federal transportation grant and as part of a complex project also to improve the downtown's streets and drainage system.

On June 15, 2015, Sid's Diner was featured on the Food Network series Top 5 Restaurants, with their fried-onion burger being highlighted. Sid's Diner has also been featured on the Travel Channel series Man v. Food.

21st century tornadoes

On May 24, 2011, an EF5 tornado struck parts of northwestern El Reno. The tornado killed a total of 9 people and injured 181 others, and had winds measured at up to 295 mph by mobile doppler radar near Interstate 40.

Two years later, on May 31, 2013, El Reno was hit by a multiple-vortex tornado. The Weather Channel's Mike Bettes was hit by this storm, but survived it.

Storm chaser Tim Samaras, his son Paul, and his TWISTEX colleague Carl Young died in the storm near the Regional Airport. Paul Samaras and Young were pulled from their Chevrolet Cobalt by the tornado's subvortex. Tim Samaras was found still buckled in the passenger's seat of the car, next to where Young had been driving.

Local amateur chaser Richard Henderson died in that same area. Before being struck, Henderson took  a picture of the tornado from his mobile phone and sent it to a friend.

Dan Robinson of St. Louis, Missouri survived the tornado with few injuries. He was a few hundred meters ahead of the TWISTEX crew.

An EF3 tornado struck southern parts of El Reno on May 25, 2019. Touching down at 10:32 pm, the tornado damaged a service station before moving east-northeastward and crossing Interstate 40. It damaged billboards before striking a motel and a mobile home park at U.S. Highway 81, both of which suffered significant damage. One part of the motel had most of its second-floor walls destroyed, and several mobile homes were destroyed, killing two people and injuring many others. East of Highway 81, the tornado damaged an automobile service building and a house on Route 66. The tornado caused tree damage before dissipating on Alfadale Road north of Route 66.

Geography

El Reno is located at the interchange of I-40 and U.S. Route 81. Jesse Chisholm is buried nearby.

In 1952, a magnitude 5.5 earthquake struck near El Reno, causing damage to several buildings in the city. It is currently Oklahoma's third-strongest earthquake on record, and it was the strongest earthquake in Oklahoma history prior to the November 5, 2011 earthquake near Sparks.

Climate
El Reno has endured numerous weather-related incidents in recent years:
 On January 30, 2002, El Reno was hit by a severe ice storm that left most of the city without power for several days and caused thousands of dollars of damage in downed trees and powerlines. The storm brought around two inches of ice, with as much as 6 inches over the following days. All of Canadian County was designated as a Federal Disaster Area.
 During the May 3, 1999 tornado outbreak, El Reno suffered damage from one of the many tornadoes that formed from the same storm that produced the infamous F5 tornado that day. Parts of Redlands Community College were damaged.
 El Reno has weathered several ice storms in recent years, including the January 4–5, 2005, storm that left up to two inches of ice in the hardest-hit locations.
 In 2006, El Reno experienced "exceptional" drought conditions, as the entire state endured one of the driest summers on record.
 On March 12, 2006, drought conditions allowed an area wildfire to grow to burn over 1000 acres (4 km).  Winds carried the smoke into the Oklahoma City metro area, spurring thousands of calls to emergency services by concerned residents.
 On April 24, 2006, a rare anticyclonic tornado hit El Reno's municipal airport, causing damage to the hangars and small airplanes.
 On the night of May 8, 2007, a tornado ripped through the south and east sides of the city. At least one injury occurred when the tornado knocked over a truck and semitrailer on I-40.
This caused extensive flooding.
 On May 24, 2011, the violent and long-tracking 2011 El Reno–Piedmont tornado passed through the El Reno area, causing extensive damage and killing nine people. The tornado was given an EF5 rating after reviewing the damage.
 On May 31, 2013, the 2013 El Reno tornado, the widest tornado ever documented, hit El Reno. The tornado was an estimated 2.6 miles in width and had a recorded wind speed of >301 mph, one of the two highest wind speeds on record along with winds observed in the 1999 Bridge Creek–Moore tornado. It hit the outskirts of the city, prompting a tornado emergency for El Reno and surrounding cities. The tornado killed eight people, including three storm chasers.
On May 25, 2019, a tornado that has been rated at EF3 struck around 10:28 pm. It struck a mobile home park and a motel, killing two people.
From February 13-17, 2021, Winter Storm Uri caused extensive damage to El Reno and surrounding areas, leaving thousands of people without power. The air temperature was lower than 0° Fahrenheit for the duration of the storm. It also dumped more than 2 feet of snow on El Reno and surrounding areas.

Demographics

El Reno is part of the Oklahoma City Metropolitan Statistical Area.

As of the census of 2010,  16,749 people, 5,727 households, and 3,842 families resided in the city. The population density was 202.7 people per square mile (78.3/km). The 6,484 housing units averaged 81.1 per square mile (31.3/km). The racial makeup of the city was 71.8% White, 11.1% Native American, 7.2% African American, 0.5% Asian, 4.7% from other races, and 4.7% from two or more races. Hispanics or Latinos of any race were 12.9% of the population.

Of the 5,727 households, which 31.7% had children under the age of 18 living with them, 50.0% were married couples living together, 12.7% had a female householder with no husband present, and 32.9% were not families. About 28.5% of all households were made up of individuals, and 12.7% had someone living alone who was 65 years of age or older. The average household size was 2.50 and the average family size was 3.08.

In the city, the  population was distributed as 24.2% under the age of 18, 10.5% from 18 to 24, 30.8% from 25 to 44, 21.1% from 45 to 64, and 13.4% who were 65 years of age or older. The median age was 35 years. For every 100 females, there were 114.7 males. For every 100 females age 18 and over, there were 119.5 males.

The median income for a household in the city was $31,200, and for a family was $39,106. Males had a median income of $29,521 versus $20,107 for females. The per capita income for the city was $15,570. About 11.4% of families and 16.3% of the population were below the poverty line, including 19.6% of those under age 18 and 10.4% of those age 65 or over.

Government and infrastructure
The City of El Reno operates under a council-manager government system. City employees include the city manager, finance director, police chief, fire chief, city clerk, public works director, code enforcement director, community services director, and city librarian.

The Federal Bureau of Prisons operates the Federal Correctional Institution, El Reno.

Transportation
El Reno is served by Interstate 40, US Route 81, US Route 270 (just west of town), and Oklahoma State Highway 66.

Intercity bus service is provided by Greyhound Lines.

El Reno Regional Airport (KRQO; FAA ID: RQO), four miles southwest, has a 5600’ x 75’ paved runway.

Commercial air transportation is available at Will Rogers World Airport, about 29 miles southeast.

El Reno is on the route of the AT&L Railroad, which has branches running to Watonga and Bridgeport through Geary, Oklahoma, with overhead trackage rights on Union Pacific to Oklahoma City.  Traffic includes grain, fertilizer and agriculture-related products.  The town is also directly on Union Pacific's rail line, and the railroad honors El Reno as a “Train Town USA,” one of 131 communities out of 7,300 communities it serves, because of the town’s unique, long-standing relationship with the line.

Education
 Canadian Valley Technology Center is on famed Route 66 about 3 mi (5 km) east of the city.
 Redlands Community College opened in 1971.

Media
The El Reno Tribune publishes Wednesday and Sunday and has a circulation around 5,000.

For many years the filmmaker George Kuchar would drive to El Reno to document the storm season, staying at the El Reno Motel.  The Result was his film Wild Night in El Reno.

Parts of the film American Underdog were filmed in El Reno.

Notable people
 Charles Cannon (1915–1997), the Texas saddlemaker, broke horses for the U.S. government in El Reno during World War II.
 Harlond Clift (1912-1992), Major League Baseball infielder
 Suzan Shown Harjo (1945-), advocate for American Indian rights
 Solomon Andrew Layton (1864-1943), architect, was born in Iowa, but moved to El Reno in 1902, then to Oklahoma City in 1911.
 Sam Pittman (1961-), Head Football Coach Arkansas Razorbacks
 Harvey Pratt (1941-), Native American forensic artist 
 Hub Reed (1936-), pro basketball player (St. Louis Hawks, Cincinnati Royals, Los Angeles Lakers, and Detroit Pistons)
 Erik Rhodes (1906-1990), Broadway and Hollywood actor
 Sam Rivers (1923-2011), jazz musician and composer
 Kenzie Ruston (1991-), NASCAR driver in the K&N Pro Series East 
 Gaylord Shaw (1942-), 1978 Pulitzer Prize–winning journalist, managing editor of Dallas Times Herald and Los Angeles Times
 Robert Stanley (aviator) (1912-1977), test pilot

See also
 
National Register of Historic Places
 Carnegie Library
 El Reno High School
 Mennoville Mennonite Church

References

External links

 City of El Reno
 El Reno Tribune
 Legends of America
 "El Reno", Encyclopedia of Oklahoma History and Culture

Oklahoma City metropolitan area
Cities in Canadian County, Oklahoma
Cities in Oklahoma
County seats in Oklahoma